Leucoptera puerariella is a moth in the Lyonetiidae family. It is known from Japan (Honshu, Kyushu).

Adults are on wing from the end of July and again from May. There are two to three generations per year.

The larvae feed on Pueraria lobata. They mine the leaves of their host plant. The mine has the form of an upper surface irregular blotch expanding along the leaf margin or vein. It is pale greenish-brown. One to three mines are found on a single leaf. Full-grown larvae leave the mine and make a spindle-shaped white cocoon covered by a flattened thin silken web at the leaf margin.

External links
Revisional Studies On The Family Lyonetiidae Of Japan (Lepidoptera)

Leucoptera (moth)
Moths described in 1964
Endemic fauna of Japan
Moths of Japan